Henry McMahon may refer to:

 Henry McMahon (diplomat) (1862–1949), diplomat known for the McMahon Line and the McMahon-Hussein Correspondence
 Henry McMahon, member of the band Big Tom and The Mainliners
 A fictional character in the 1997 book Term Limits by Vince Flynn